is a Japanese video game artist, designer and director working for Square Enix (formerly Square). He designed characters for the Final Fantasy series, debuting with Final Fantasy VI and continuing with various later installments. Additionally, Nomura co-created and has led the development of the Kingdom Hearts series since its inception in 2002 and was the director of the 2005 film Final Fantasy VII: Advent Children.

Early life
Nomura's father influenced his interest in art and games early on, creating little drawings and unique Sugoroku board games for him. Nomura started drawing at the age of three years and developed his own Sugoroku games during his elementary school years. As a child, he spent much of his free time playing baseball, swimming, fishing and building fortresses. When he was in middle school, his father told him that an era of computers would come and bought him his own computer. Nomura played Legends of Star Arthur: Planet Mephius on it and started creating his own video games by learning programming. He first tried a Nintendo product with the tennis and ping-pong variant of the Color TV-Game console and later borrowed a Family Computer in high school. Around that time, Dragon Quest became Nomura's favorite because it surprised him and introduced him to video games with story elements. His art teacher in high school pointed him towards the works of Final Fantasy illustrator Yoshitaka Amano. Nomura also created his own manga during class and intended to do this as a profession although he ultimately abandoned the idea. Nomura went to vocational school to learn magazine and advertising artwork. Nomura then looked for an advertising job at a publishing company. However, he eventually applied to Square after he had seen a job advertisement with a drawing by Yoshitaka Amano.

Career

1990s
In the early 1990s, Nomura was hired by Square and at first worked as a debugger for Final Fantasy IV. Some time later, the company's staff was divided and he was placed in the team in charge of Final Fantasy. After he had received some training by artist Tetsuya Takahashi, Nomura designed the monsters for Final Fantasy V. At that time, each Final Fantasy developer had their own plan book as a compilation of ideas to present to the director of a game. While the others typed their plan books at the computer and then printed them out, Nomura wrote his by hand and attached many drawings which impressed director Hironobu Sakaguchi and event planner Yoshinori Kitase. Nomura then became the graphic director of Final Fantasy VI. For this game, he conceived the characters Shadow and Setzer as well as their background stories. Their designs were reused from some of Nomura's abandoned concepts for Final Fantasy V. Following several smaller projects, Nomura was asked to be the principal character designer of Final Fantasy VII in replacement for Amano. Nomura drew the game's characters in a stylized and chibi way and came up with the idea for the "Limit Break" attacks. He also took part in the making of the story and had a hand in plot elements such as Aerith's death. In 1998, Nomura worked on both Parasite Eve and Brave Fencer Musashi. He then designed characters and monsters for Final Fantasy VIII in what he described as his "actual style of drawing", working alongside art director Yusuke Naora to realize the more realistic approach to the game's graphics. Additionally, he wrote the character's background stories and was the battle visual director in charge of designing fight sequences. Afterwards, Nomura worked on several different projects for Square, for example as a character designer of the 1998 fighting game Ehrgeiz which also used characters from Final Fantasy VII.

2000s
Nomura was the character designer for 2000s beat 'em up The Bouncer before he returned to the Final Fantasy series in the same capacity with 2001's Final Fantasy X. He worked with the staff so that the characters' clothes would be identical in full motion videos and in-game scenes, unlike in Final Fantasy VIII. In February 2000, he started working as the director of Kingdom Hearts with the production team consisting of over one hundred members from both Square and Disney Interactive. Nomura first heard of the game during a discussion between Shinji Hashimoto and Hironobu Sakaguchi regarding the use of the character of Mickey Mouse in a video game. He was inspired to work on Kingdom Hearts by Nintendo's platforming game Super Mario 64. After discussing with the Disney staff, Nomura convinced them to use original characters with him as the character designer. The game's protagonist, Sora, became his favorite character he had designed so far. Following Kingdom Hearts, Nomura worked once again on the Final Fantasy series with Final Fantasy XI and Final Fantasy X-2.

For the Compilation of Final Fantasy VII metaseries which featured new titles based on Final Fantasy VII, Nomura was once again the character designer. A sequel to Kingdom Hearts started development around the completion of Kingdom Hearts Final Mix, an international version which added more foreshadowing elements regarding the series' plot. Nomura continued his work on the series with Kingdom Hearts: Chain of Memories for the Game Boy Advance in 2004. He had originally planned to work directly on the PlayStation 2 sequel Kingdom Hearts II. However, desire from fans to play the original game on a portable console resulted in the creation of Chain of Memories which would bridge the gap between Kingdom Hearts and Kingdom Hearts II. Afterwards, Nomura was the director and lyricist for the CGI animated film Final Fantasy VII: Advent Children which was released in 2005 in Japan. This marked his film debut, and he redesigned the characters as well. Nomura joined the film's crew after producer Yoshinori Kitase called him and eventually became the director because of his attachment to the character of Cloud Strife. He split the role of directing with Takeshi Nozue.

Kingdom Hearts II was released in 2005, resolving the elements foreshadowed in the first game's secret ending. As a result of being set a year after previous titles, Nomura was careful to make the plot accessible to newcomers. After Square Enix had finished development of the updated version Kingdom Hearts II Final Mix+, Nomura was approached by Disney which expressed interest in a sequel. He said "We have various ideas, but we're not at the point where we can say that." Wishing to stop using the character of Sora temporarily, Nomura instead wanted to continue the series with games that explained different subplots. This resulted in the creation of Kingdom Hearts 358/2 Days for the Nintendo DS in 2008 which explored events that set up the story of Kingdom Hearts II. In mid-2007, Nomura mentioned a desire to create a spin-off Kingdom Hearts game on a mobile platform and wanted it to play slightly differently from other titles in the series. The resulted was Kingdom Hearts Coded, a game set after the events of Kingdom Hearts II, which was later remade for the Nintendo DS in 2010.

In the meantime, Nomura was also responsible for the main character designs and orchestration of The World Ends with You for the Nintendo DS. In 2009, he was also the main character designer of Final Fantasy XIII. The graphics capabilities of the PlayStation 3 and Xbox 360 compared to previous consoles allowed Nomura to use more complex elements in the character designs than before, such as Lightning's cape and detailed facial features. This in turn meant that the art team had to do much more work for each character or area than in previous games. Nomura did not take an involved role in the creation of the non-playable characters. In 2008, he was the character designer of Dissidia Final Fantasy. The game was originally envisioned by Nomura as a Kingdom Hearts spin-off featuring a cast of Disney characters. He later felt uncomfortable with the Disney characters fighting each other and instead opted to use Final Fantasy characters. Nomura was responsible for the character designs, which changed much of the look and style of Amano's illustrations.

2010s
In 2010, Square released Kingdom Hearts Birth By Sleep, a prequel of the first Kingdom Hearts that explained scenes shown in Kingdom Hearts II and its updated version. In early 2011, Square released a follow up to Dissidia titled Dissidia 012 Final Fantasy. The game carried several ideas Nomura had ever since early development, such as the inclusion of new characters and new gameplay mechanics. For 2011's Final Fantasy XIII-2, Nomura only created the new characters' faces as other staff members designed their clothes. Once the Kingdom Hearts coded remake was released, Nomura and his companions had already thought about creating Kingdom Hearts 3D: Dream Drop Distance, a game that would set up the events of Kingdom Hearts III. The game was released for the Nintendo 3DS owing to the team's positive reaction to the console's quality. Nomura confirmed that he would be considering what he called an "HD Technical Test" in order to commemorate the series' tenth anniversary and to entice players new to the series. This occurred on March 3, 2012 in the form of a premiere event where footage from the game, including its full CGI introduction sequence, was showcased to celebrate the game's release. In May 2012, Nomura revealed he was working as the director of a new Kingdom Hearts game that had yet to be announced by Square Enix. He was directing Final Fantasy XV which originally entered production as Final Fantasy Versus XIII shortly before its announcement in May 2006.  Nomura left his position of director on Final Fantasy XV following "changes in development structure" by Square Enix in December 2013. After his departure from Final Fantasy XV, development of Final Fantasy VII Remake began, with Nomura directing the project and other key members of the original Final Fantasy VII development team, Kitase and Kazushige Nojima returning as producer and scenario writer. At E3 2015, Final Fantasy VII Remake was announced with Nomura confirmed to be the director of the game. Nomura designed the charications in the "Torna" organization for Xenoblade Chronicles 2. Nomura also designed bosses for the Eden raid in Final Fantasy XIV expansion, Shadowbringers.

2020s 
In April 2020, Tetsuya Nomura and Square Enix launched the critically acclaimed Final Fantasy VII Remake. He worked as the director of the project, character designer, and concept designer. After a successful launch, Nomura would go on to work on downloadable content for the game called "intermission", which released in 2021. During this, he was also working on the next installation, Final Fantasy VII Rebirth. Work for that project began in 2019, however it was revealed in an interview with him that progress for the game would be shown in the year 2022. As for a specific date on when it would be shown, or a release date for the project, one was not announced. He would begin working on it as the Creative director ( the person in charge of the creative vision for the game), as well as the concept designer and the character designer.  He is also working on the recently announced Kingdom Hearts IV. Just as the previous game, he will be in charge of the character design, the story, and the concept design. as for this projects release date, and when more news would be shared, no release date was given, and any more visual showcases for the game will come at a later date, and not during the summer. Testsuya Nomura also created art pieces for his characters, on post cards which can be purchased in October. He also created artwork which was used to introduce Kingdom Hearts IV, which displayed many of the characters he has created through the games long timespan

Style and influences 
Nomura considers Yoshitaka Amano one of his biggest inspirations when doing artwork. His four "seniors" Hironobu Sakaguchi, Yoshinori Kitase, Hiroyuki Ito and Tetsuya Takahashi were also described as major influences. He even compared Sakaguchi to something "like a godly figure" during his early days at Square. At that time, Nomura was also taught the basics of game design by Ito. He told Nomura never to stick to existing concepts but rather to reuse just specific ideas and explained concepts such as ease of control and effortless accessibility of magic spells. Ito's work as a battle system designer inspires Nomura when thinking of the gameplay system for the Kingdom Hearts games. When designing characters, Nomura wants their names and outfits to be related with their personalities. An example occurs in Final Fantasy X where the protagonist Tidus was given a colorful uniform in order to reflect his cheerful personality and to contrast with the previous moody Final Fantasy characters. His name as well as Yuna's, another character appearing in the game, also have a common theme, the former being Okinawan for "Sun" and the latter Okinawan for "night". Various characters such as Squall Leonheart and Lulu are given multiple accessories, making the games more challenging for the programmers. When directing Advent Children, Nomura explained how the film was different from Western films due to the lack of direct answers from the plot. He added that he wants viewers to interpret certain scenes themselves and then discuss them with friends as another way to enjoy the film. The same occurs within the Kingdom Hearts series where the scenes that show unknown characters are left to the player's imagination until the following scene reveals it.

Works

Accolades
Nomura received the "Excellence in Visual Arts" award by the International Game Developers Association for his work on the first Kingdom Hearts game, alongside Shinji Hashimoto. In IGN's "The Top 100 Video Game Creators of all Time" Nomura was listed at number 84.

References

External links

 
 MobyGames profile

1970 births
Final Fantasy designers
Japanese video game designers
Japanese video game directors
Living people
People from Kōchi Prefecture
Square Enix people
Video game artists
Video game writers
Artists from Kōchi Prefecture